András Dienes (born 15 October 1974) is a Hungarian football player.

External links
bama.hu: Dienes András a mislenyiekhez szerződött 
kozarmislenyse.hu Sqiad for season 2009–2010 
Profile on hlsz.hu 

Hungarian footballers
Living people
1974 births
Association football defenders
Pécsi MFC players
Kozármisleny SE footballers
Győri ETO FC players
FC Tatabánya players
Sportspeople from Pécs